Plagiobothrus is a monotypic genus of Asian brushed trapdoor spiders containing the single species, Plagiobothrus semilunaris. It was first described by Ferdinand Karsch in 1892, and has only been found in Sri Lanka, documented from the regions of Peradeniya and Kandy. Its abdomen is black above and brown beneath.

See also 
 List of Barychelidae species

References

Monotypic Mygalomorphae genera
Barychelidae
Endemic fauna of Sri Lanka
Spiders of Asia
Taxa named by Ferdinand Karsch